The 2nd AIBA African 2004 Olympic Boxing Qualifying Tournament was held in Gaborone, Botswana from March 15 to March 22, 2004. It was the second and last chance for amateur boxers from Africa to qualify for the 2004 Summer Olympics after the 2003 All-Africa Games in Abuja, Nigeria. The number one and two earned a ticket for the Olympic Tournament in Athens, Greece, except for the heavyweight and super heavyweight division (no berths at stake).

Medal winners

Qualified

Light Flyweight (– 48 kg)

Flyweight (– 51 kg)

Bantamweight (– 54 kg)

Featherweight (– 57 kg)

Lightweight (– 60 kg)

Light Welterweight (– 64 kg)

Welterweight (– 69 kg)

Middleweight (– 75 kg)

Light Heavyweight (– 81 kg)

See also
Boxing at the 2003 All-Africa Games
1st AIBA African 2004 Olympic Qualifying Tournament

References

African 2
2004 in Botswana sport
March 2004 sports events in Africa